Rachid Benmahmoud (born 14 September 1971 in Rabat) is a Moroccan former footballer.

External links 
  Rachid Benmahmoud
 

1971 births
Living people
Moroccan footballers
Footballers from Rabat
Moroccan expatriate footballers
Morocco international footballers
2000 African Cup of Nations players
2002 African Cup of Nations players
Association football midfielders
Al Ahli Club (Dubai) players
Al-Rayyan SC players
Expatriate footballers in Qatar
Expatriate footballers in the United Arab Emirates
Moroccan expatriate sportspeople in the United Arab Emirates
Moroccan expatriate sportspeople in Qatar
Fath Union Sport players
Al-Arabi SC (Qatar) players
Khor Fakkan Sports Club players
Dibba Al-Hisn Sports Club players
Qatar Stars League players
UAE Pro League players
UAE First Division League players
Competitors at the 1993 Mediterranean Games
Mediterranean Games competitors for Morocco
20th-century Moroccan people